Tengzhou is a county-level city of Zaozhuang, Shandong province of the People's Republic of China, and is the site of the feudal vassal State of Teng during the Spring and Autumn period.

Tengzhou was likely the birthplace of the philosopher Mozi, and the city hosts the Mozi Memorial Hall to commemorate him.

The Mayor of Tengzhou is Liu Wenqiang, and the Tengzhou Party Committee Secretary is Shao Shiguan.

History 
The settlement of Tengzhou is said to date back to the Yellow Emperor.

After the collapse of the Shang dynasty, present-day Tengzhou became the center of the independent Teng state. Eventually, it was conquered by the Qin state.

Upon the reunification of the region, the region became incorporated as Teng County. It remained as Teng County until the Jin Dynasty, when it became the Tengyang Prefecture. The prefecture was abolished at the start of the Ming Dynasty.

From 1945 to 1953, the county changed administration numerous times, before finally becoming Teng County.

On March 7, 1988, Teng County became the county-level city of Tengzhou.

Geography 

Climate 

Administrative divisions

The county-level city of Tengzhou administers 21 township-level divisions: 5 subdistricts and 16 towns. These township-level divisions then administer 1,226 village-level divisions.

Subdistricts 

Towns 

Demographics 
As of 2019, Tengzhou is home to 1,756,300 people, living in 518,500 households. The city has about 927,900 males and 828,400 females. The city has a birth rate is 10.65 per thousand, a death rate of 6.15 per thousand, and a rate of natural increase of 4.49 per thousand.

In addition to the city's Han Chinese population, 30 ethnic minorities live in Tengzhou, the largest of which is the Hui people. As of 2009, the city's ethnic minority population totaled 4,050, with the Hui people comprising 2,280 of this population.

Economy

Agriculture 
In 2019, 788,100 tons of agricultural produce was made, a 2.1% increase from 2018. 56,200 hectares of vegetables were harvested, representing a 0.7% increase from 2018. The city's pigs were afflicted by African swine fever, resulting in a 27.4% drop in live pigs from 2018 to 2019. The city slaughtered 27.08 million heads of poultry in 2019, a 5.7% increase from the previous year. Tengzhou's aquaculture output totaled 41.2 thousand tons in 2019, a decline of 8.9% from the previous year.

Industry 
As of 2019, Tengzhou had 254 industrial enterprises above designated size. The value added of industrial enterprises above designated size increased by 3.2% from 2019, with light industry increasing 1.3%, and heavy industry increasing 3.8%. Major industries in Tengzhou include chemicals, minerals, petroleum, coal, food processing, Chinese medicine, electronic components, and cement.

In the early 2010s, Tengzhou, which had been a major manufacturing area, was experiencing an economic downturn which closed many local factories. However, The Wall Street Journal reported in July 2015 that innovation, particularly in manufacturing, had revitalized the local economy.

Retail 
In 2019, the city's total retail sales of consumer goods increased by 4.9%, with urban retail sales increasing 3.6%, and rural retail sales increasing by 9.9%. In 2019, Tengzhou's auto sector grew by 10.7%; its books, newspapers, and magazines retail sales increased by 16.5%; Tengzhou's sports and entertainment goods retail sales increased by 27.7%.

Foreign investment and trade 
In 2019, Tengzhou received $45.59 million of foreign investment, which was utilized for 19 different projects. In 2019, ¥328 million worth of goods was imported into Tengzhou, and ¥3.445 billion worth of goods was exported from Tengzhou.

Transport

Road 
National Highway 104 runs through the city, as does the Beijing-Fujian Expressway.

Rail 
The Beijing–Shanghai railway, the Beijing–Shanghai high-speed railway both run through the city.

Maritime 
The city's two ports, Xin'an Port and Tengzhou Port are connected to the Beijing-Hangzhou Grand Canal.

References

External links
Government website of Tengzhou (in Simplified Chinese, Traditional Chinese,  English, Japanese and Korean)
Tengzhou Daily on Net (in Simplified Chinese)
Tengzhou Mobile (in Simplified Chinese)()

Cities in Shandong